During the 1936 season, Legia Warsaw participated in the Ekstraklasa.

It was the only season in history in which Legia were relegated from the top-division league. It was also a season that brought Legia long-term disgraceful records (a record number of lost matches in a row and in the season overall), the beating of which was brought about only in their 2021–22 season.

Competitions

Ekstraklasa

League table

Match results

References

Legia Warsaw seasons
Legia Warsaw